In Two Minds is a television play by David Mercer commissioned for The Wednesday Play (BBC 1) anthology drama series. First transmitted on 1 March 1967, it was directed by Ken Loach and produced by Tony Garnett and features Anna Cropper in the lead role.

Outline and production
The play depicts the experiences of Kate Winter (Cropper),  a young woman with schizophrenia, and her experiences with the medical professionals who attempt to care for her in a mental hospital. She is shown being given Electroconvulsive therapy (ECT) as a clinical treatment and being discussed at a lecture for medical students.

In Two Minds was influenced by the ideas of R. D. Laing expressed in his co-authored book, Sanity and Madness in the Family. Attempting to demonstrate that schizophrenia lacks an organic basis in the brain, Laing believed that the family had the potential to make people mentally ill. Mercer and producer Tony Garnett were introduced to Laing and his colleague David Cooper, by the theatre critic Kenneth Tynan; Laing and Cooper served as an official consultants on the project.

It is the earliest of Loach's television works to be shot entirely on location, without any use of the television studio. Loach's previous Wednesday Play, Cathy Come Home, contains five brief scenes which were shot electronically. By the time In Two Minds was in production, an agreement had been reached between Equity, the actors' union, and the BBC to allow the shooting of drama entirely on film in the conventional manner.

Cast
Anna Cropper as Kate Winter
Brian Phelan as The Interviewing Doctor
George A. Cooper as Mr. Winter
Helen Booth as Mrs. Winter
Christine Hargreaves as Mary Winter
Peter Ellis as Jake
Adrienne Frame as Hairdresser
Bill Hays as Man at the rehearsal room
Vickery Turner as Woman at the rehearsal room
Yvonne Quenet as Girl in the bar
Neville Smith as Man at the pub
Malcolm Taylor as Man at the pub
Patrick Barr as Consultant
George Innes as Paul Morris
Anne Hardcastle as Doctor
Edwin Brown as Mental Warfare officer
Eileen Colgan as Sister
Julie May as Nurse

Responses
The play gained mixed response from psychiatrists at the time of its first broadcast, with some arguing that Kate is depressed and hysterical rather than truly schizophrenic.

In his review for The Listener, the novelist Anthony Burgess felt the play had not found a resolution for Kate's problems and found the form of the play problematic. Despite accusing the whole Wednesday Play series as being 'anti-art,' he wrote that In Two Minds "was better than art because it was so real". Conversely, within the BBC Drama department, the play had led to intense discussions between producer Tony Garnett and department head Sydney Newman over its status as drama and its veracity. Television critic Anthony Hayward wrote that Cropper displayed "a rollercoaster of emotions, from breaking down on pondering her dilemma to giving a beaming smile, eyes sparkling, while recalling an ex-boyfriend. At times, she talks as if 'Kate' is another person."

Legacy
In Two Minds won the Writers' Guild Award for the Best Television Play of 1967. It is included in the Ken Loach at the BBC 6 DVD box set.

Family Life (1971), again directed by Loach and with a screenplay by Mercer, is a feature film remake of this television play.

References

External links

1967 television films
1967 films
1967 television plays
BBC television dramas
British docudrama films
Films directed by Ken Loach
Social realism in film
1960s British films